Ipan is a rural beachside community located in the village of Talofofo on the east coast of the United States Territory of Guam. Ipan is a census-designated place in Guam. Ipan contains two beach resorts: Jeff's Pirates Cove and Ipan Beach Resort. Ipan Park is a popular location for family barbecues and parties.

After World War II, Camp Dealy was constructed in Ipan and served as a recreational area for military personnel.  Today, all that remains of the camp are the remnants of concrete structures along the beach.

Ipan is also the site of the Pangelinan Quarry which provides high quality limestone aggregate used in the concrete of many of Guam's utility poles.  The area is accessible by Route 4, a two lane road.

References 

Census-designated places in Guam